The 2004 MTV Video Music Awards aired live on August 29, 2004, honoring the best music videos from the previous year. The show took place at the American Airlines Arena in Miami, Florida, and, unlike in previous years, had no host.

Background
MTV announced on April 16 that the 2004 Video Music Awards would be held on August 29 at the American Airlines Arena in Miami. The move to Miami was partially caused by a date conflict with the 2004 Republican National Convention, which was held from August 30 to September 2 in the VMAs' traditional location of New York City. Nominees were announced on July 27 at a press conference hosted by Missy Elliott and Usher in Miami. At the same press conference, MTV announced that the ceremony would not have a host, partially due to the scale of the venue. The ceremony broadcast was preceded by the 2004 MTV Video Music Awards Pre-Show by the Shore, marking the first time since 1990 that the Opening Act branding was not used for a VMAs pre-show. Hosted by Kurt Loder and SuChin Pak with reports from John Norris, Sway, and Gideon Yago, the broadcast featured red carpet interviews. The broadcast marked the first time that MTV used a tape delay for the VMAs, which indirectly resulted from the Super Bowl XXXVIII halftime show controversy. Several aspects of the ceremony tied into MTV's Choose or Lose 2004 campaign encouraging youth voter turnout, including Outkast's performance and the appearance of the Bush sisters and Kerry sisters.

Performances

Presenters

Pre-show
 Kurt Loder and SuChin Pak – announced the winners of the professional categories and Breakthrough Video

Main show
 Jennifer Lopez – opened the show and introduced Usher
 Will Smith – introduced Shaquille O'Neal and presented Best Pop Video with him
 Hilary Duff and Matthew Lillard – presented Best Rap Video
 Shakira – introduced Jet, Hoobastank and Yellowcard
 Jon Stewart – appeared in several vignettes explaining the Viewer's Choice award voting procedures
 Omarion and Eva Mendes – presented Best Female Video
 Marc Anthony – introduced Kanye West
 Christina Aguilera and Missy Elliott – presented Best Male Video
 Carson Daly – introduced the Kerry and Bush sisters and the next pair of presenters
 The Kerry (Alexandra and Vanessa) and Bush (Barbara and Jenna) sisters – urged viewers to vote on the next elections and reminded them to donate to the Red Cross to help the victims of Hurricane Charley
 Lenny Kravitz and Naomi Campbell – presented Best R&B Video
 Dave Chappelle – performed a short comic monologue and introduced Lil Jon, Petey Pablo, and the Terror Squad
 Gwen Stefani and Owen Wilson – presented Best Rock Video
 Mary-Kate and Ashley Olsen – introduced Jessica Simpson
 D12 and Good Charlotte (Benji and Joel Madden) – presented Best Video Game Soundtrack
 Rev. Al Sharpton – appeared during one of Jon Stewart's vignettes
 Jimmy Fallon, Queen Latifah and Wayne Coyne – presented Best Hip-Hop Video
 Will Forte – played "Gary," the announcer with whom Fallon had a verbal spat while trying to present an award, and introduced Wayne Coyne
 Xzibit and Ludacris – introduced Nelly and Christina Aguilera
 P. Diddy and Mase – presented Best Dance Video
 Christina Milian and LL Cool J – introduced Alicia Keys
 Paris Hilton and Nick Lachey – presented Best Group Video
 Ashlee Simpson and Tony Hawk – presented Best New Artist in a Video
 Alicia Keys – paid tribute to Ray Charles
 Beastie Boys and "Sasquatch" – presented the MTV2 Award
 Mandy Moore and Marilyn Manson – introduced The Polyphonic Spree
 JoJo – introduced American gold medalists Kaitlin Sandeno, Kerri Walsh, Misty May and Carly Patterson, and presented Viewer's Choice with them
 Gwyneth Paltrow – presented Video of the Year
 John Mellencamp and Amy Lee – introduced OutKast
 Also, MTV VJs Sway, La La, Damien Fahey and Vanessa Minnillo emceed and interviewed celebrities backstage before several commercial breaks

Winners and nominees
Winners are in bold text.

See also
2004 MTV Europe Music Awards

References

External links
Official awards site
Official MTV site

2004
MTV Video Music Awards
MTV Video Music Awards
MTV Video Music Awards
2000s in Miami